Robert Muir Morton (25 February 1891 – 4 December 1948) was a Scottish amateur footballer who played as a forward and scored 82 goals in 134 Scottish League appearances for Queen's Park.

Personal life 
Morton's younger brother Alan also became a footballer and the pair were teammates for six seasons at Queen's Park.

Career statistics

References

Scottish footballers
Scottish Football League players
Queen's Park F.C. players
1948 deaths
Association football fullbacks
1891 births
Association football forwards
People from Renfrew
Footballers from Glasgow